Julius Drum (March 18, 1958– September 17, 2007), also known as Julius L. Corder, was a Native American actor.

Born in Winnebago, Nebraska, Drum was adopted at the age of five by John and Dorothy Corder of McCook, Nebraska. Upon graduating from school, he entered medical school in California and supported himself as a television commercial actor. He was a member of the Screen Actors Guild.

Drum played Richard Yellow Hawk in the 1992 movie, Thunderheart. He also acted in the 2012 movie, Dark Blood, although the movie was not released during Drum's lifetime.

He had been involved with the Lincoln Indian Center and was active in the American Indian Movement. He received the Outstanding New Performer award from First Americans in the Arts for his work in Thunderheart.

Complications from diabetes forced Drum to seek help at the Carl T. Curtis Health Center in Macy, Nebraska. He died at the center on September 17, 2007.

Filmography

References

External links

1958 births
2007 deaths
Native American male actors
Omaha (Native American) people
Ho-Chunk people
20th-century American male actors
Male actors from Nebraska
People from Thurston County, Nebraska
People from McCook, Nebraska